The Hôtel de Villeroy is an 18th-century building in Paris, built on the initiative of Antoine Hogguer of Saint-Gall, Baron de Presles for his mistress, the actress Charlotte Desmares.

History 
It is located at no 78 rue de Varenne in the 7th arrondissement of Paris, not far from the Hôtel de Matignon, located on the same street. Since 1881, it has housed the French Ministry of Agriculture and Food.

Its current occupant is Julien Denormandie, Minister of Agriculture and Food since July 6, 2020.

Bibliography 
 Allermoz-Wallez (Sylvie), « L’hôtel de Villeroy », dans Le Faubourg Saint-Germain : rue de l'université, Paris, Délégation à l’Action artistique de la Ville de Paris, Société d’Histoire et d’Archéologie du 7e arrondissement, 1987, pp. 29–31.
Gabriel Mareschal de Bièvre, L’hôtel de Villeroy et le Ministère de l'Agriculture, Paris, Edouard Champion, 1924, 158 p.

References

Buildings and structures in the 7th arrondissement of Paris